Clydell Castleman (September 8, 1913 – March 2, 1998) was a pitcher in Major League Baseball who played from 1934 through 1939 for the New York Giants, including the National League Champion team that lost to the New York Yankees in six games in the 1936  World Series.

References

External links

1913 births
1998 deaths
Baseball players from Nashville, Tennessee
Durham Bulls players 
Major League Baseball pitchers
Montreal Royals players
Nashville Vols players
New York Giants (NL) players
People from Donelson, Tennessee